Sir Ulick Burke, 3rd Baronet (died 1708) of Glinsk, was an Irish Galway landowner and politician who was MP for Galway (1689).

Career
He was the son of Sir Edmund Burke, 2nd Baronet. The family resided at Glinsk Castle. Ulick Burke espoused the cause of King James II and was an MP for Galway County in the Patriot Parliament of 1689, and was included in the articles of the Treaty of Limerick. He married Ismay, fourth daughter of Colonel John Kelly of Skreen, County Roscommon. He died without issue in 1708 and was succeeded by his half brother, John Burke, 4th Baronet.

Lament for Sir Ulick Burke Marbhna Uillioc Búrca
Sir Ulick was immortalised by the Irish composer and musician Turlough O'Carolan is his songs Ulliac Búrca (Ulick Burke) and Marbhna Uillioc Búrca (Lament for Sir Ulick Burke).

References

External links
Carolan's song Ulliac Búrca

1708 deaths
Baronets in the Baronetage of Ireland
Members of the Parliament of Ireland (pre-1801) for County Galway constituencies
Politicians from County Galway
Irish Jacobites
Ulick
Year of birth missing
Irish MPs 1689